Juunju Daarrba Nhirrpan National Park (Cape York Peninsula Aboriginal Land) is a national park in the Shire of Cook, Queensland, Australia. The national park was previously named Starcke National Park until it was renamed on 28 November 2013.

The national park is 1,619 km northwest of Brisbane and has an area of 8,039 hectares.

See also

 Protected areas of Queensland

References

National parks of Far North Queensland
Protected areas established in 1977
1977 establishments in Australia